Chinameca may refer to:

El Salvador
Chinameca, San Miguel, San Miguel Department
Chinameca (volcano)
Chinameca Sporting Club, a football team
San Francisco Chinameca, La Paz Department
Mexico
Chinameca, Morelos
Chinameca Municipality, Veracruz